is a Japanese record label founded in the late 1980s as a subsidiary of the entertainment company VAP, based in Japan. On May 30, 1990, it was established as an independent company.

Toy's Factory, as of the first half of 2012, is the fourth-biggest Japanese record label.

Sub-labels

 Bellissima!
 BMD Fox Records
 Carnage
 Deep Blue
 Idyllic
 Jūonbu Records
 Kimi
 Meme Tokyo
 Noframes Recordings

Notable artists

Armageddon
Babymetal – on Jūonbu Records and then BMD Fox Records
Brahman - on Noframes 
Bump of Chicken
Daoko
Dempagumi.inc
Meme Tokyo
Ego-Wrappin'
Eve
Livetune
Mr. Children
Reol
Salyu
Sekai no Owari
Shōnan no Kaze
Taichi Mukai
Toshiki Masuda
Unison Square Garden
Yuzu

References

External links
 

Japanese record labels
Record labels established in 1990
1990 establishments in Japan
Mass media companies based in Tokyo
Shibuya